A dehesa is a multifunctional, agrosylvopastoral system (a type of agroforestry) and cultural landscape of southern and central Spain and southern Portugal; in Portugal, it is known as a montado. Its name comes from the Latin 'defensa' (fenced) referring to land that was fenced, and usually destined for pasture. Dehesas may be private or communal property (usually belonging to the municipality). Used primarily for grazing, they produce a variety of products, including non-timber forest products such as wild game, mushrooms, honey, cork, and firewood. They are also used to raise the Spanish fighting bull and the Iberian pig. The main tree component is oaks, usually holm (Quercus rotundifolia) and cork (Quercus suber). Other oaks, including melojo (Quercus pyrenaica) and quejigo (Quercus faginea), may be used to form dehesa, the species utilized depending on geographical location and elevation. Dehesa is an anthropogenic system that provides not only a variety of foods, but also wildlife habitat for endangered species such as the Spanish imperial eagle.

By extension, the term can also be used for this style of rangeland management on estates.

Ecology

The dehesa is derived from the Mediterranean forest ecosystem, consisting of grassland featuring herbaceous species, used for grazing cattle, goats, and sheep, and tree species belonging to the genus Quercus (oak), such as the holm oak (Quercus rotundifolia), although other tree species such as beech and pine trees may also be present. Oaks are protected and pruned to produce acorns, which the famous black Iberian pigs feed on in the fall during the montanera. Ham produced from Iberian pigs fattened with acorns and air-dried at high elevations is known as Jamón ibérico ("presunto ibérico", or "pata negra" in Portuguese), and sells for premium prices, especially if only acorns have been used for fattening.

In a typical dehesa, oaks are managed to persist for about 250 years. If cork oaks are present, the cork is harvested about every 9 to 12 years, depending on the productivity of the site. The understory is usually cleared every 7 to 10 years to prevent the takeover of the woodland by shrubs of the rock rose family (Cistaceae), often referred to as "jara", or by oak seedlings. Oaks are spaced to maximize overall productivity by balancing light for the grasses in the understory, water use in the soils, and acorn production for pigs and game.

There is debate about the origins and maintenance of the dehesa, and whether or not the oaks can reproduce adequately under the grazing densities now prevailing.

The dehesa is in many ways similar to the California oak woodland, although the former is typically much more intensively managed.

Importance and economic context

The dehesa system has great economic and social importance on the Iberian Peninsula because of both the large amount of land involved and its importance in maintaining rural population levels. The major source of income for dehesa owners is usually cork, a sustainable product that supports this ancient production system and old growth oaks. High end black iberian pigs and sale of hunting rights also represent significant income sources. Periodic hunts in the dehesa are known as the monteria. Groups attend a hunt at a private estate and wait at hunting spots for game to be driven to them with dogs. They usually pay well for the privilege, hunting wild boar, red deer and other species.

The area of dehesa usually coincides with areas that could be termed "marginal" because of both their limited agricultural potential (due to the poor quality of the soil) and a lack of local industry, which results in isolated agro-industries and very low capitalization.

Extent 
Dehesa covers nearly 20,000 square kilometers on the Iberian Peninsula, mainly in:

Portugal
Alentejo
Algarve

Spain
Córdoba
Extremadura
Salamanca
Sierra Morena
Sierra de Aracena
Sierra Norte de Sevilla

See also
 Cabañeros National Park
 List of types of formally designated forests
 Oak savanna
 California oak woodland
 Satoyama
 Silvopasture

References

Notes

Bibliography 
 Fra. Paleo, Urbano. (2010). "The dehesa/montado landscape". pp. 149–151 in Sustainable Use of Biological Diversity in Socio-ecological Production Landscapes, eds. Bélair, C., Ichikawa, K., Wong, B.Y.L. and Mulongoy, K.J. Montreal: Secretariat of the Convention on Biological Diversity. Technical Series no. 52.
 Huntsinger, Lynn; Adriana Sulak; Lauren Gwin; and Tobias Plieninger. (2004). "Oak woodland ranchers in California and Spain: Conservation and diversification". In Advances in Geoecology, ed. S. F. A. Schnabel.
 Joffre, R; Rambal, S; Ratte, JP. (1999). "The dehesa system of southern Spain and Portugal as a natural ecosystem mimic," Journal of Agroforestry 45(1-3): 57-79.
 McGrath, Susan. (2007). "Corkscrewed," Audubon magazine, January–February.

External links 

 Plataforma integralDehesa - Página web de agentes del sector
 Proyecto Biodehesa 
 Foro encinal 
 Acción por la dehesa 
 Dehesas ibéricas 
Observatorio de la dehesa y el montado

Natural regions of Europe
Geography of Spain
Agriculture in Spain
Non-timber forest products
Forestry in Spain
Agriculture in Portugal
Geography of Portugal
Agroforestry systems
Quercus
Cultural landscapes